Karen Elaina Price (born July 17, 1960) is an American model, actress, stunt woman and television producer. She is sometimes credited as Karen Castoldi. She was Playboy magazine's Playmate of the Month in January 1981. Her centerfold was photographed by Ken Marcus.

Career
After she became a Playmate, Price started acting, but soon switched to performing stunts for over two dozen movies including Leonard Part 6 (1987), Police Academy 2: Their First Assignment (1985), and The Golden Child (1986). After a hiatus, she began a new career as an associate producer of television programs such as Amazing Vacation Homes (2004) and Amazing Babies (2005).

Price made a cameo appearance of sorts in the early Mel Gibson film The Road Warrior - her centerfold is pasted onto a tailfin of Gyro Captain's Benson gyrocopter.

See also
 List of people in Playboy 1980–1989

References

External links
 
 

1960 births
Living people
1980s Playboy Playmates
American stunt performers